BL Mark X is a breech-loading naval gun and can stand for at least two different types. See:
BL 9.2 inch gun Mk IX – X
BL 12 inch Mk X naval gun